Robert Lawton may refer to:

 Robert B. Lawton (born 1947), American Jesuit and president of Loyola Marymount University
 Robert O. Lawton (1924–1980), professor at Florida State University